Vitimopsyche is an extinct genus of Mecopteran which existed in what is now northeastern China during the early Cretaceous period. It contains the species Vitimopsyche kozlovi and V. torta.

References

Mecoptera
Cretaceous insects
Fossil taxa described in 2010
Cretaceous insects of Asia
Insects described in 2001
Prehistoric insect genera